Basegi is a mountain range in Middle Ural. Located in the eastern portion of Perm Krai, on the border between Gremyachinsky and Gornozavodsky districts, it stretches meridionally. Its length is about 32 km, width is 5 km (in the widest central part). The highest point is the mountain "Middle Baseg" (994 m); it has a dome shape.

To the north of the range flows the Usva River; to the south is the Vilva River. The Basegi range is a source of most of the tributaries of these two main rivers. 
The Basegi Nature Reserve is located in the foothills of the range. To the north of the Basegi range is situated the highest point of Middle Ural, Oslyanka.

There are several versions about the origins of the name. One of them is that the name stems from the Komi-Permyak word 'basok' which means "beautiful". Another theory claims that ‘baseg’ is a composition of the words ‘bas’ (beautiful) and ‘eg’ (river).

References 
Basegi in Great Soviet Encyclopedia
Basegi in Encyclopedia of Perm Krai

Mountain ranges of Russia
Landforms of Perm Krai